Leslie Barkly Charge (27 July 1891 – 30 March 1957) was an Australian rules footballer who played with South Melbourne in the Victorian Football League (VFL).

Football
Charge was a ruckman from Leopold, who appeared as a follower in South Melbourne's 1912 and 1914 VFL Grand Final losses. He took a while to establish a place in the team but from 1912 to 1914 was a regular fixture, playing 56 of his 65 senior matches.

He later played in Sydney and was a member of North Shore's 1921 premiership side.

Death
He died, in New South Wales on 30 March 1957.

References

1891 births
1957 deaths
Australian rules footballers from Melbourne
Australian Rules footballers: place kick exponents
Leopold Football Club (MJFA) players
Sydney Swans players
North Shore Australian Football Club players
People from Richmond, Victoria